Semra Özal (née Yeğinmen; born 12 January 1934) was the 8th first lady of Turkey as the spouse of the 8th President of Turkey Turgut Özal. She was also the second lady of Turkey during her husband's prime ministry from 1983 to 1989. The couple has three children: Ahmet Özal (born 1955), Zeynep Özal (born 1956) and Efe Özal (born 1967). During the government of the Motherland Party (ANAP), she presided the Turkish Women Empowerment and Promotion Foundation, also known as the "Daisies" (Papatyalar). From 1991 to 1992, she was the head of the provincial organization of the Motherland Party (ANAP) in Istanbul. Her husband Turgut Özal died in 1993 while in office. Semra Özal lives in Istanbul.

See also 
Özal family
List of prime ministers of Turkey

References 

1934 births
First Ladies of Turkey
Living people